Carlos Lagrotta was an Argentine actor. In 1943 he starred in Benito Perojo's Stella. Other films include Hay que educar a Niní (1940), Santa Cándida (1945), The Headless Woman (1947) and El muerto es un vivo (1953).

Selected filmography
Educating Niní (1940)
 By the Light of a Star (1941)
 His Best Student (1944)
 Seven Women (1944)
 Saint Candida (1945)
 The Sin of Julia (1946)
 El Muerto es un vivo (1953)

References

External links
 

Argentine male film actors
20th-century Argentine male actors
Year of birth missing
Possibly living people